William Stanley Cooper (8 April 1899 – 14 February 1984) was an Australian rules footballer who played with St Kilda in the Victorian Football League (VFL).

Notes

External links 

1899 births
1984 deaths
Australian rules footballers from Victoria (Australia)
St Kilda Football Club players